Mitsuhiro (written: 光洋, 光尋, 光弘, 光浩, 光博, 光広, 光寛, 光裕, 光宏, 光啓, 充洋 or 充弘) is a masculine Japanese given name. Notable people with the name include:

, Japanese baseball player
, Japanese singer, rapper, actor and dancer
, Japanese voice actor
, Japanese mixed martial artist
, Japanese footballer
 Mitsuhiro Kitta (born 1942), Japanese golfer
, Japanese film director
, Japanese footballer
, Japanese politician
, Japanese figure skater and coach
, Japanese announcer
, Japanese sprinter
, Japanese footballer
, Japanese mathematician
, Japanese academic
, Japanese footballer
, Japanese biologist
Mitsuhiro Yoshimura (born 1973), Japanese musician

Japanese masculine given names